is a Japanese professional shogi player ranked 9-dan. He is the current holder of the Eiō, Kisei, Ōi, Ōshō, Ryūō and Kiō titles. He is the youngest person to be awarded professional status by the Japan Shogi Association and one of only five players to become professional while still a junior high school student.

Since becoming a professional, Fujii has broken a number of professional shogi records including being the youngest player to win a professional shogi tournament, the youngest player to challenge for a major title, the youngest player to win a major title, the youngest player to be a 2-crown title holder, the youngest player to defend a major title, the youngest player to be awarded the rank of 9-dan, the youngest to be a 3-crown title holder, the youngest to be a 4-crown title holder, the youngest to be a 5-crown title holder and the youngest to be a 6-crown title holder. He also won his first 29 games as a professional to set a new record for most consecutive games won, and the first player to win all current non-title tournaments in a single shogi year.

Early life
Fujii was born in Seto, Aichi on July 19, 2002. His mother was a homemaker and his father was a company employee. He learned shogi at age five after being given a shogi set by his grandmother and started out playing games with his grandfather. Eventually he became too strong for his grandfather, so he started taking formal lessons at a neighborhood shogi school. As an elementary school student first-grade student, he began playing games against junior high school and senior high school students to test his skill.

Fujii's intense focus surprised his mother and his competitive spirit often led to crying outbursts when he lost. As a second-grade student, he got the opportunity to play a game against shogi professional Kōji Tanigawa as part of a simultaneous exhibition at a shogi event in Nagoya. Due to time limitations, Tanigawa offered Fujii a draw even though Fujii had a losing position. Upset by the offer, Fujii flipped the board and pieces, and then began crying until his mother came to take him away from the board.

Fujii was seven years old when met his future professional shogi mentor Masataka Sugimoto 7-dan for the first time. Sugimoto was amazed by the "marvelous perspective" and "insight" Fujii showed at such a young age and says that he is "the personification of fighting spirit" who "takes the frustration of defeat and directs it at the next match".

Shogi apprentice professional
Fujii officially entered the shogi professional apprentice school as a 10-year-old under the sponsorship of Sugimoto with the rank of 6-kyū in September 2012. He became the youngest person ever to be promoted to 3-dan in October 2015 at the age of 13 years 2 months. Fujii competed in the "59th 3-dan league" with other 3-dan ranked apprentices from April to September 2017 and finished in first place with a 13-5 record to win promotion to the rank of professional 4-dan. He was only the eighth 3-dan player since 1987 to be promoted to professional status after only one season in the "3-dan league". Fujii's promotion to full professional status by the JSA became official on October 1, 2017.

Shogi professional
Fujii's debut game as a professional was on December 24, 2016, and he defeated 76-year-old Hifumi Katō. Katō was at the time the oldest active shogi professional, and the age gap of 62 years and 6 months between the two players broke the previous record of 58 years and 7 months set in 1986 when 15-year-old Yoshiharu Habu played 74-year-old .

On April 4, 2017, Fujii defeated Hiroshi Kobayashi to win his 11th straight game since turning professional and break the previous record of 10 jointly held by Yoshiyuki Matsumoto and Masakazu Kondō.

Fujii won his 13th game in a row when he defeated Shōta Chida in the round one of the 67th NHK TV Shogi Tournament on April 17, 2017. The game result was posted the same day on the Japan Shogi Association's official website, even though the game was not broadcast on NHK-E until May 14, 2017. This is something which was highly unusual because NHK tournament games are pre-recorded, and game results are not made public until the game is actually broadcast.

Fujii became the fastest professional to reach 50 wins in official games on November 21, 2017, when he defeated Shingo Hirafuji. Fujii achieved his 50th win in his 56th official game in just ten months and twenty-nine days since his professional debut, surpassing the previous record held by Habu, who won his 50th game in his 66th game and took one year and two months.

On February 1, 2018, Fujii defeated Hirotaka Kajiura in a Meijin Class C2 game to improve his league record to 9 wins and 0 losses and ensure his promotion to Meijin Class C1 in April 2018. Fujii's promotion to Class C1 also meant his promotion to the rank of 5-dan, thus making him the first junior high school student to ever be awarded the rank.

Fujii became the youngest player to win a professional shogi tournament on February 17, 2018, when he defeated Akihito Hirose in the final of the 11th Asahi Cup Open. Fujii advanced to the final by defeating the reigning Ryūō and Kisei title holder Yoshiharu Habu in the semi-finals held earlier that same day. Fujii's victory at age 15 years and 6 months broke the previous record of 15 years and 10 months set by Hifumi Katō in 1955. Fujii's victory also meant automatic promotion to the rank of 6-dan, thus making him the youngest player to ever be awarded such a rank by breaking the previous record (also held by Katō) of 16 years and 3 months.

On March 15, 2018, Fujii defeated Tatsuya Sanmaidō to finish Class 2 play undefeated at 10 wins and 0 losses. Fujii became the first player in six years to finish Class 2 play undefeated. The victory was Fujii's 15th in a row, which made him the holder of the two longest consecutive winning streaks for the 2017 shogi season. Fujii's victory was also his 60th victory overall in a single year which made him not only the 4th player ever to reach 60 wins, but also the youngest player ever to do so.

On March 28, 2018, Fujii played his final game as a junior high school student and of the 2017 shogi season when he faced Keita Inoue in a third round preliminary round game for the 68th Ōshō Tournament. The game was broadcast live by the Igo & Shogi Channel as part of its "Shogi Premium" service. Inoue won the game in 137 moves, thus becoming the first player aged 50 or older to defeat Fujii in an official game. Inoue's victory also stopped Fujii's 16 game winning streak. Fujii's winning streak began after a loss to on Takahiro Ōhashi on January 6, 2018, and included wins over the reigning Meijin title holder Satō, the reigning Ryūō title holder Habu, former Ōshō title holder Hirose, former Ryūō title holder Tetsurō Itodani as well as his first official game against his mentor Sugimoto.

Fujii became the youngest player to be promoted to 7-dan when he defeated Kōhei Funae on May 18, 2018. Fujii's win in the championship game for Ryūō Class 5 meant that he achieved Ryōū ranking class promotion for two consecutive years, thus satisfying the promotion criteria for 7-dan. Fujii's record of reaching 7-dan at age 15 years 9 months broke the previous record of 17 years 3 months set by Hifumi Katō in 1957.

In October 2018, Fujii won his second shogi championship when he defeated apprentice professional Wakamu Deguchi 3-dan 2 games to 0 to win the 49th  tournament. Fujii's victory made him the youngest player ever to win the tournament at 16 years and 2 months, breaking the 31-year-old record of 17 years and 0 months set by Toshiyuki Moriuchi in 1987.

Fujii at age 16 became the youngest player to win 100 official games as a professional on December 12, 2018. Fujii's victory also made him the fastest (two years and two months since turning professional) to achieve such a result, and his winning percentage of .847 (100 wins and 18 losses) is also the highest of any player to have previously won 100 games.

On January 8, 2019, Fujii defeated Eisaku Tomioka in Mejin Class C1 league play. The win was Fujii's 18 consecutive win in Meijin League play since debuting as a shogi professional which tied the record set by Makoto Nakahara 52 years earlier. Fujii, however, was defeated by Seiya Kondō in his next league game on February 5, 2019, to end the winning streak.

In February 2019, Fujii successfully defended his Asahi Cup championship when he defeated Kiō title holder Akira Watanabe to win the 12th Asahi Cup Open tournament.

In March 2020, Fujii became the first shogi professional to achieve a .800 winning percentage or greater for three consecutive years when he defeated Akira Inaba in challenger league play for the 61st Ōi tournament.

Fujii defeated Takuya Nagase on June 4, 2020, to earn the right to challenge  for the 91st Kisei title. Fujii's victory not only allowed him to be come the challenger for a major title for the first time, it also made him the youngest person ever (at the age 17 years, 10 months and 20 days) to challenge for a major title, breaking the record set 31 years earlier by Nobuyuki Yashiki by four days. In title match against Watanabe, Fujii won the first two games before losing Game 3. He then won Game 4 to win the match 3 games to 1 and becomeat the age of 17 years and 11 monthsthe youngest major title holder in professional shogi history.

On August 20, 2020, Fujii won the Ōi title from Kazuki Kimura. Fujii defeated Kimura 4 games to 0 to win the 61st Ōi title. Fujii's victory made him the youngest person to become a 2-crown title holder and also the youngest person to be promoted to the rank of 8-dan.

In October 2020. Fujii defeated Tetsurō Itodani to win the 28th . The game was played on October 15, 2020, but the result was not made public until the game was broadcast on December 12, 2020.

In February 2021, Fujii won the Asahi Cup Open tournament for the third time by defeating Hiroyuki Miura in the finals of the 14th Asahi Cup Open.

On July 3, 2021, Fujii successfully defended the Kisei title in the 92nd Kisei Tournament, defeating  3 games to 0. His successful title defense made him the youngest player to successfully defend a major title, and also meant that he satisfied the promotion criteria for the rank of 9-dan. Fujii's promotion to 9-dan at age 18 years and 11 months made him the youngest player to ever be promoted to 9-dan.

Fujii successively defended his Ōi title in JuneAugust 2021 by defeating challenger Masayuki Toyoshima 4 games to 1 to win the 62nd Ōi title match. Fujii actually lost Game 1 of the match before winning the next four games to retain his crown. In JulySeptember 2021, Fujii challenged Toyoshima for the latter's Eiō title, with Fujii coming out on top again to win the 6th Eiō title match 3 games to 2. Fuiji and Toyoshima met in a major title match for a third time in 2021 when Fujii challenged Toyoshima for the Ryūō title in 34th Ryūō title match held in OctoberNovember 2021. Fujii won the match 4 games to none to become the youngest 4-crown title holder.

In February 2022, Fujii defeated  4 games to 0 to win the 71st Ōshō title (JanuaryFebruary 2022). The victory made Fujii not only the fourth player to become a 5-crown title holder, but also the youngest to achieve such a feat.

Fujii successfully defended his Eiō title by defeating Wakamu Deguchi 3 games to 0 to win the 7th Eiō title match (AprilMay 2022). In JuneJuly 2022, Fujii defeated  3 games to 1 to successfully defend his Kisei title. In JuneSeptember 2022, Fujii defeated  4 games to 1 in the 63rd Ōi title match to successfully defend his Ōi title and become youngest player to have won ten major titles. In OctoberDecember 2022, Fujii defeated Akihito Hirose 4 games to 2 to successfully defend his Ryūō title.

On November 20, 2022, Fujii won the  tournament for the first time when he defeated Shintarō Saitō to win the 43rd JT Cup.

Fujii won the televised Ginga tournament for the second time when he defeated Taichi Takami to win the 30th Ginga Tournament on December 27, 2022. 

It was the fourth time Fujii won the tournament.

On March 12, 2023, Fujii defeated challenger  in Game 6 of the 72nd Ōshō title match (JanuaryMarch 2023) 4 games to 2. This was the first time the two met in a major title match. The match was tied at two wins apiece after four games, but Fujii won the next two games to defend his Ōshō title.
	
On March 19, 2023, Fujii defeated  in Game 4 of the 48th Kiō title match (FebruaryMarch 2023} to win the match 3 games to 1. This made Fujii not only the second but also the youngest player to become a 6-crown title holder at age 20 years 8 months. On the same day, the final of the 72nd NHK Cup was broadcast and Fujii defeated Yuki Sasaki 8-dan to win the tournament for the first time. The win also made Fujii the first professional shogi player in history to win all non-major title tournaments in a single season.

29-game winning streak
After defeating Katō to win his debut game, Fujii proceeded to win his next 28 official games before losing to Yūki Sasaki on July 2, 2017. His 29 consecutive wins broke the previous record of 28 set by Hiroshi Kamiya in 1987.

Opponents

Impact
Fujii's winning streak was widely covered by Japanese and overseas media outlets. His promotion to professional status and his subsequent success was viewed as helping the Japan Shogi Association recover from the scandal of the 29th Ryūō challenger controversy; a scandal which had ultimately led to the resignation of the JSA's president in January 2017, the removal of several directors in February 2017, and a general loss of public confidence.

Fujii's streak not only helped the JSA recover from the aforementioned scandal, but also provided an economic boost as well. The streak led to increased sales of shogi books, and other merchandise, etc. as well as a general increase in shogi's popularity nationwide, particularly among young children. Local merchants in Fujii's hometown of Seto held commemorative sales to honor him for the streak and for his 15th birthday, and it was estimated almost 7.4 million people watched the live webcast of Fujii's record-setting victory. Sensu (folding hand fans) signed by Fujii were sold by the JSA in both Tokyo and Osaka in an unusual move since such a thing is typically only reserved for major title holders; the fans, however, quickly sold out at both locations in less than an hour despite there being a limit set at one fan per person, with people lining up in advance to receive a numbered ticket to purchase a fan. Some of the fans sold subsequently showed up on online auction websites where bids up to JPY 15,600 were observed despite the original sale price of about JPY 2,300.

In December 2017, the JSA estimated that the over all impact of Fujii's streak on its advertizing revenue had been roughly 18.5 billion yen.

Promotion history 
The promotion history of Fujii is as follows:
 6-kyū: September 2012
 3-dan: April 2016
 4-dan: October 1, 2016
 5-dan: February 1, 2018
 6-dan: February 17, 2018
 7-dan: May 18, 2018
 8-dan: August 20, 2020
 9-dan: July 3, 2021

Titles and other championships
Fujii has appeared in 13 major title matches, and has won 13 major titles. He has also won eight shogi non-title tournaments.

Major titles

Other championships

Awards and honors
On March 13, 2018, the JSA announced that Fujii had been confirmed to be the winner of its Annual Shogi Awards for "Most Games Won", "Best Winning Percentage", "Most Game Played" and "Most Consecutive Games Won" for his results during the 2017 professional shogi season (April 1, 2017March 31, 2018). Fujii is the youngest player to win those four major awards in the same year and only the third shogi professional to accomplish the feat since 1967. On April 2, 2018, the JSA announces that Fujii had been awarded the "Best New Player"、the "Special Award" and the "Game of the Year Special Prize" awards as well.

In February 2018, Fujii received a special commendation from Aichi Prefecture for his victory in the 11th Aichi Cup Open and his other shogi accomplishments. Fujii is the youngest ever and only the sixth individual to have received said commendation. Fujii was awarded the Seto City's "Distinguished Citizen Award" in March 2018.

Annual Shogi Awards
45th Annual Shogi Awards (April 2017March 2018): Best New Player, Special Award, Best Winning Percentage, Most Games Won, Most Games Played, Most Consecutive Games Won, Game of the Year Special Prize
46th Annual Shogi Awards (April 2018March 2019): Kōzō Masuda Award
47th Annual Shogi Awards: Most Games Won, Best Winning Percentage, Special Game of the Year
48th Annual Shogi Awards: Player of the Year, Best Winning Percentage, Most Games Won, Game of the Year, Special Game of the Year, Masuda Special Prize
49th Annual Shogi Awards: Player of the Year, Most Games Won, Most Games Played, Game of the Year

Other awards
2018: Seto City "Distinguished Citizen Award", Aichi Prefecture "Special Commendation"

Year-end prize money and game fee ranking
Fujii has finished in the "Top 10" of the JSA's  four times since turning professional: 9th place with JPY 21,080,000 in earnings for 2019; 4th place with JPY 45,540,000 in earnings in 2020; 3rd place with JPY 69,960,000 in earnings in 2021; and 1st place with JPY 122,050,000 in earnings in 2022.

Tsume Shogi Solving Competition
In March 2018, Fujii won the 15th Tsume Shogi Solving Competition, thus becoming the only person to win the competition four years in a row. Fujii was the only participant, which included both amateur and professional shogi players, to finish with a perfect score of 100 points. Fujii first won the competition in 2015 as a 12-year-old apprentice shogi professional 2-dan. He was the only participant to finish with a perfect score to become the youngest winner in the competition's history.

Abema TV appearances
Fujii has been featured in several programs broadcast on the JSA's shogi channel of the Internet television station AbemaTV.

The games were unofficial, which meant the results did not affect his official win–loss record, and his opponents were (in order) Yasuhiro Masuda, Takuya Nagase, Shintarō Saitō, Taichi Nakamura, Kōichi Fukaura, Yasumitsu Satō and Yoshiharu Habu. Fujii won all of the games except Game 2 against Nagase.

Personal life
In October 2017, Fujii announced that it was his intention to enter senior high school after graduating from junior high school in the spring of 2018. Fujii said that he gave becoming a full-time shogi professional serious consideration but stated "I'd like to continue to progress and make every experience a positive one." Fujii decision was widely anticipated in Japan and was viewed favorably by fellow shogi professionals and some education critics. Fujii's decision to continue his education is the same one made by the other four shogi professionals who obtained professional status while still a junior high school student.

On March 20, 2018, Fujii graduated from Nagoya University Affiliated Lower Secondary School located in Nagoya. He enrolled as a student at Nagoya University Affiliated  Upper Secondary School in April 2018 but announced that he had left high school at the end of January 2021 to focus on shogi.

Notes

References

General references

External links
ShogiHub: Professional Player Info · Fujii, Souta
Shogi prodigy breathes new life into the game - Japan Times editorial
 Shogi Fan:
Fujii Souta 29th victory
Fujii Souta got his 28th victory
Fujii Souta fever!

2002 births
Japanese shogi players
Living people
People from Seto, Aichi
Professional shogi players
Professional shogi players from Aichi Prefecture
Eiō
Kisei (shogi)
Ōi (shogi)
Ōshō
Ryūō
Ginga
Shinjin-Ō